In mathematics, the longest element of a Coxeter group is the unique element of maximal length in a finite Coxeter group with respect to the chosen generating set consisting of simple reflections. It is often denoted by w0.

Properties 
 A Coxeter group has a longest element if and only if it is finite; "only if" is because the size of the group is bounded by the number of words of length less than or equal to the maximum.
 The longest element of a Coxeter group is the unique maximal element with respect to the Bruhat order.
 The longest element is an involution, by uniqueness of maximal length (the inverse of an element has the same length as the element).
 For any  the length satisfies 
 A reduced expression for the longest element is not in general unique.
 In a reduced expression for the longest element, every simple reflection must occur at least once.
 If the Coxeter group is finite then the length of w0 is the number of the positive roots.
 The open cell Bw0B in the Bruhat decomposition of a semisimple algebraic group G is dense in Zariski topology; topologically, it is the top dimensional cell of the decomposition, and represents the fundamental class.

See also
 Coxeter element, a different distinguished element
 Coxeter number
 Length function

References

 
 

Coxeter groups